Wagner Creek is a stream in the U.S. state of Oregon. It is a tributary to Bear Creek.

Wagner Creek was named in 1852 after one Jacob Wagner.

References

Rivers of Oregon
Rivers of Jackson County, Oregon